Yudh  is an Indian television psychological thriller miniseries directed by Ribhu Dasgupta and Dipti Kalwani, starring Amitabh Bachchan. The show was created by Anurag Kashyap. It also stars  Sarika, Zakir Hussain, Mona Wasu, Nawazuddin Siddiqui and Kay Kay Menon. This show is Bachchan's debut fiction television show . Produced by Endemol India and Saraswati Creations, Yudh premiered on Sony Entertainment Television India on 14 July 2014.

Plot
Yudhisthir Sikarwar (Amitabh Bachchan) is an elite businessman who owns a conglomerate company known as the Shanti Group which consists of Shanti Constructions and Shanti Mining in Ghaziabad, Uttar Pradesh. He wishes to venture into the mining industry but he is diagnosed with Huntington's disease, an incurable neuropsychological disorder, which leaves him with a few years to live.

Cast
 Amitabh Bachchan as Yudhisthir Sikarwar  
 Sarika as Gauri Shekhar
 Ayesha Raza Mishra as  Nayantara Sikarwar 
  Pavail Gulati as Rishikesh  Sikarwar  
 Aahana Kumra as Taruni Sikarwar 
Avinash Tiwary as Advocate Ajatshatru
 Mona Wasu as Mona Shekhar  
 Zakir Hussain as Anand Upadhyay  
 Tigmanshu Dhulia as Home Minister Bharat  Choudhary
 Kay Kay Menon as Municipal Commissioner
 Nawazuddin Siddiqui as Sanjay Kumar Mishra
 Anurag Kashyap as Mr. Sikarwar
  Yusuf Hussain as Gautam Dev
 Shaiza Kashyap as taker
  Siddharth Chandra as Rahul Mehra
 Himesh Choudhary as Chhotu
Inder Kumar as Raju

Reception

DNA India praised the light use of background music, casting and the unobtrusive camera work, but stated that the production values were lacking for a project where each episode cost an estimated  3 crores, stating that the sets were "tacky" and the sound quality was poor.

References

External links
Official page

2014 Indian television series debuts
2014 Indian television series endings
Sony Entertainment Television original programming
Indian drama television series
Television shows set in Delhi
Television shows set in Uttar Pradesh
Indian LGBT-related television shows